Montelukast, sold under the brand name Singulair among others, is a medication used in the maintenance treatment of asthma. It is generally less preferred for this use than inhaled corticosteroids. It is not useful for acute asthma attacks. Other uses include allergic rhinitis and hives of long duration. For allergic rhinitis it is a second-line treatment.

Common side effects include abdominal pain, cough, and headache. Severe side effects may include allergic reactions, such as anaphylaxis and eosinophilia. Use in pregnancy appears to be safe. Montelukast is in the leukotriene receptor antagonist family of medications. It works by blocking the action of leukotriene D4 in the lungs resulting in decreased inflammation and relaxation of smooth muscle.

Montelukast was approved for medical use in the United States in 1998. It is available as a generic medication. In 2020, it was the fourteenth most commonly prescribed medication in the United States, with more than 31million prescriptions.

Medical uses
Montelukast is used for a number of conditions including asthma, exercise induced bronchospasm, allergic rhinitis, and urticaria. It is mainly used as a complementary therapy in adults in addition to inhaled corticosteroids, if inhaled steroids alone do not bring the desired effect. It is also used to prevent allergic reactions and asthma flare-ups during the administration of intravenous immunoglobulin. It may also be used as an adjunct therapy in symptomatic treatment of mastocytosis. It is taken by mouth, as a tablet, chewable tablet, or as granules.

Adverse effects
Common side effects include diarrhea, nausea, vomiting, mild rashes, asymptomatic elevations in liver enzymes, and fever. Uncommon side effects include fatigue and malaise, behavioral changes, paresthesias and seizures, muscle cramps, and nose bleeds. Rare (may affect up to 1 in 10,000 people taking montelukast) but serious side effects include behavioral changes (including suicidal thoughts), angioedema, erythema multiforme, and liver problems.

In 2019 and 2020, concerns for neuropsychiatric reactions were added to the label in the United Kingdom and United States where the most frequently suspected were nightmares, depression, insomnia (may affect between 1 in 100 to 1 in 1,000 people taking montelukast); aggression, anxiety and abnormal behaviour or changes in behaviour (may affect between 1 in 1,000 and 1 in 10,000 people taking montelukast).

FDA investigation
In June 2009, the U.S. Food and Drug Administration (FDA) concluded a review into the possibility of neuropsychiatric side effects with leukotriene modulator drugs. Although clinical trials only revealed an increased risk of insomnia, post-marketing surveillance showed that the drugs are associated with a possible increase in suicidal behavior and other side effects such as agitation, aggression, anxiousness, dream abnormalities and hallucinations, depression, irritability, restlessness, and tremor.

In September 2019, the Pediatric Advisory Committee and the Drug Safety and Risk Management Advisory Committee met to discuss a pediatric-focused safety review of neuropsychiatric events with montelukast.

In March 2020, the FDA required a boxed warning for montelukast to strengthen an existing warning about the risk of neuropsychiatric events associated with the drug in the wake of an increase in case reporting of neuropsychiatric events around the time of the initial communications about the concern from FDA in 2008. The boxed warning advises health care providers to avoid prescribing montelukast for people with mild symptoms, particularly those with allergic rhinitis because there are many other effective, less-concerned allergy medicines that are also indicated for the mild cases.

In the FDA's self-conducted data analysis in comparison to their received case reports which were dependent on people's self-claims, the propensity of developing neuropsychiatric disorders after montelukast use does not outpace that of inhaled corticosteroids; and there were no statistically significant risks of new-onset neuropsychiatric disorders among males, females, patients 12 years and older, patients with a psychiatric history, or after the 2008 FDA communication and prescribing information changes that first publicized the concern. In addition, FDA's self-conducted data analysis also summarized their own findings, saying "exposure to montelukast was significantly associated with a decreased risk of treated outpatient depressive disorder and the decreased risks were seen among patients with a history of a psychiatric disorder, in patients 12 to 17 years as well as 18 years and older, and in both females and males." "Treated outpatient depressive disorder" refers to patients' actions of making an appointment with psychiatrists to contend with their depressions.

Drug interactions
Montelukast is an inhibitor of the drug metabolizing enzyme CYP2C8, part of the cytochrome P450 system. Therefore, it is theoretically possible that the combination of montelukast with a CYP2C8 substrate (e.g. amodiaquine, an anti-malarial drug) could increase the plasma concentrations of the substrate. However, clinical studies have shown minimal interactions between montelukast and other CYP2C8 substrate drugs, which is most likely due to the high plasma protein binding exhibited by montelukast.

Pharmacology

Montelukast is in the leukotriene receptor antagonist family of medications. It works by blocking the action of leukotriene D4 in the lungs resulting in decreased inflammation and relaxation of smooth muscle.

Montelukast functions as a leukotriene receptor antagonist (cysteinyl leukotriene receptors) and consequently opposes the function of these inflammatory mediators; leukotrienes are produced by the immune system and serve to promote bronchoconstriction, inflammation, microvascular permeability, and mucus secretion in asthma and COPD. Leukotriene receptor antagonists are sometimes colloquially referred to as leukasts.

Two genes of interest are ALOX5 and LTC4S, which catalyze two major steps in the biosynthetic pathway of leukotrienes.

Montelukast may affect nerve remyelination in combination with Pexidartinib and this may cause clinical benefits or side effects.

Patents
Singulair was covered by U.S. Patent No. 5,565,473 which expired on 3 August 2012. The same day, the FDA approved several generic versions of montelukast.

The United States Patent and Trademark Office launched a reexamination of the patent covering Singulair on 28 May 2009.  The decision was driven by the discovery of references that were not included in the original patent application process.  The references were submitted through Article One Partners, an online research community focused on finding literature relating to existing patents.  The references included a scientific article produced by a Merck employee on the active ingredient in Singulair.  A previously filed patent had been submitted in the same technology area. Seven months later the U.S. Patent and Trademark Office determined that the patent in question was valid based on the initial reexamination and new information provided, submitting their decision on 17 December 2009.

Use with loratadine

Schering-Plough and Merck sought permission to market a combined tablet with loratadine and montelukast. However, the FDA has found no benefit from a combined pill for seasonal allergies over taking the two drugs in combination, and on 25 April 2008, issued a not-approvable letter for the combination.

Names

The Mont in montelukast stands for Montreal, the place where Merck (MSD) developed the drug.

Montelukast is sold under a variety of brand names including Monalast (Ziska Pharmaceuticals Ltd) Montenaaf (NAAFCO Pharma) Montelon-10 (Apex), Montene (Square), Montair-10, Montelo-10, Monteflo, and Tukast L in India, Reversair (ACI Bangladesh), Monas, Miralust, Montiva, Provair, Montril, Lumona, Lumenta, Arokast and Trilock in Bangladesh, Ventair in Nepal, Montika in Pakistan, Montelair in  Brazil, Zykast in the Philippines though combined with levocetirizine, Desmont, Levmont, Aircomb and Notta in Turkey, Topraz in South Africa and AirOn in Venezuela.

References

External links
 
 

Alkene derivatives
Chloroarenes
Cyclopropanes
CYP2C8 inhibitors
Leukotriene antagonists
Merck & Co. brands
Quinolines
Thioethers
Wikipedia medicine articles ready to translate